Negueira is one of seven parishes (administrative divisions) in the municipality of Grandas de Salime, within the province and autonomous community of Asturias, in northern Spain.

The population is 35 (INE 2006).

Villages and hamlets
Airela
Armilda
Pelóu (Pilóu)
Villadefondo (Viladofondo)

References

Parishes in Grandas de Salime